Baharly is a village in the Zangilan District of Azerbaijan.

History
The village was located in the Armenian-occupied territories surrounding Nagorno-Karabakh, coming under the control of ethnic Armenian forces during the First Nagorno-Karabakh War in October 1993.

The village subsequently became part of the self-proclaimed Republic of Artsakh as part of its Kashatagh Province, referred to as Garnavan. 

It was recaptured by Azerbaijan on 21 October 2020 during the 2020 Nagorno-Karabakh war.

Notable natives 
 Mahammad Asadov — Minister of Internal Affairs of Azerbaijan (1990–1991).

References 

Populated places in Zangilan District